The End of All Things to Come is the second studio album by American heavy metal band Mudvayne. Released on November 19, 2002, the album expanded upon the sound of the band's first album, L.D. 50, with a more versatile range of sounds, dynamic, moods and vocalization.

The band wrote the album's songs in less than a month, drawing inspiration from their self-imposed isolation during the songwriting process, and crafted a more mature sound which drew from jazz and progressive rock influences, as well as elements of death metal and thrash metal. The album's strong sales led to it being certified Gold by the RIAA in 2003.

Production

The album was recorded at Pachyderm Studios in Minnesota during 2002 with the producer David Bottrill, who had previously produced albums for groups such as Tool and Silverchair. The band had very little time to make the album, in contrast to the recording of the previous album, L.D. 50. The drummer, Matthew McDonough, said, "We had all the time in the world to write our first album, but for the second one, we had about a month. I'm amazed how quickly we came up with the material."

Vocalist Chad Gray said, "The making of The End of All Things to Come was an exercise in deadline management for the band. We didn't want to take much more than two years between albums and since we were on the road for such a long time that really didn't leave us with a whole lot of time to make this record. We wrote and rehearsed for four months and then spent another four months to record and master the entire album. The pressure made us focus instead of fold." With the creation of the album's artwork, Mudvayne hoped to create the band's "black album".

Musical style 
MTV said The End of All Things to Come derives influence from several styles, including death metal, progressive rock, jazz metal and harmony-filled classic rock. AllMusic described the album sound as "standard-issue heavy metal thrash" similar to that of Metallica. MTV compared the album's style to groups such as King's X, Pantera and Tool, referring to the music as "multi-textured metal loaded with prog-rock shifts"

During the album's songwriting process, the band intentionally isolated themselves for inspiration. The album expanded upon the sound of L.D. 50 with a wider range of riffs, tempos, moods and vocalization. Matt McDonough described the songs on the album as "even weirder" than those on L.D. 50, and also believes the album is more mature.

McDonough said "If I hadn't pointed out which song was written in  I don't think most people would have noticed. It's a strange time signature but it works because it's smooth", while Gray added that it was the hardest song on the album to record.

Reception 

The End of All Things to Come was certified Gold by the RIAA in 2003.

Positive reviews came from Entertainment Weekly, which deemed it to be more "user-friendly" than L.D. 50, Launch.com, which said that "While the group attacks things with great velocity and singer Chud shreds his larynx at regular intervals, the always difficult follow-up album features actual melodies and mature textures that make the band's eventual transformation into a progressive rock band nearly inevitable" and MTV, which described the album as "a scarring blend of Pantera, Voivod and Tool, with a smattering of King's X".

The Daily News Journal also gave the album a positive review, writing, "The End of All Things to Come captures Mudvayne at a time when the band has found its voice and is hitting its stride with confidence."

Mixed reviews came from AllMusic, which wrote, "The musicians still churn out standard-issue heavy metal thrash à la Metallica to support Chüd's nihilistic pronouncements, usually sung in an enraged howl," from Blender, which wrote, "The End is rather ordinary--severe, belligerent riffs and vocals that sound as though singer Chud gargles molten lava," and Rolling Stone, which wrote, "Enjoy the band's extraterrestrial makeover; it's far more amusing than the music." A negative review appeared in Spin, simply stating, "No."

Track listing

Personnel
Mudvayne
 Chad Gray – lead vocals
 Greg Tribbett – guitars, backing vocals
 Ryan Martinie – bass
 Matthew McDonough – drums

Production
 David Bottrill – production, engineer, mixing
 Brent Sigmeth – assistant engineer
 Aimee Macauley – art direction
 Nitin Vadukul – photography

Chart positions

Weekly charts

Year-end charts

Certification

References

2002 albums
Mudvayne albums
Albums produced by David Bottrill
Epic Records albums